Paul Wallbank is an Australian speaker, broadcaster and writer on business and technology issues.

After some years travelling in Australia, Europe and East Asia while working in the construction industry, Paul set up a computer support company on Sydney's North Shore in January 1995. He stepped away from day-to-day operations of the business in 2007 with its interstate expansion.

In 1998 Paul was invited onto 702 ABC Sydney (2BL) to discuss the Y2K issue and answer listener's questions.  The success of this segment lead to two monthly segments on ABC Local Radio programs, Nightlife with Tony Delroy and the Sydney 702 Weekend program with Simon Marnie.

In addition to this, Wallbank has a weekly column on the Australian Smart Company website discussing business and technology issues. He has also written one small business technology book and adapted five Dummies guides for the Australian market.

Books 
The Australian Small Business Guide to Computers : Getting the Most Out of Your It Investment (2001). 
PC's for Dummies 3rd Australian Edition (2004).  
Laptops for Dummies Australian Edition (2005).  
Internet for Dummies 3rd Australian Edition (2006) with Maryanne Phillips.  
PC's for Dummies 4th Aust Edition (2008).  
Internet for Dummies 4th Aust Edition (2009).  
eBu$iness, Seven Steps to Online Success(2011).

References

External links 
Official PC Rescue Website
Paul Wallbank's personal website
Smartcompany column

People in information technology
Business speakers
Living people
People from Sydney
Australian non-fiction writers
Australian radio personalities
Year of birth missing (living people)